Maya Beach Village is a village in the Stann Creek District of Belize located on the Placencia Peninsula, between Riversdale Village and Seine Bight. Based on the 2010 national census, Maya Beach has a population of 225 year round residents. The village is home to a number of resorts, boutique hotels, and vacation homes. Notable resorts include Maya Beach Hotel Bistro, Belize Ocean Club, and Naia Resort & Spa. The village is often considered a part of the peninsula's largest community and namesake, Placencia, which is a short drive from the village. Maya Beach is served by the Placencia Airport, with the closest international hub being Philip S. W. Goldson International Airport in Belize City.

See also
 Geography of Belize
 History of Belize

References 

Populated places in Stann Creek District